Foreign Harbour (Swedish: Främmande hamn) is a 1948 Swedish drama film directed by Hampe Faustman and starring Adolf Jahr, George Fant and Fritiof Billquist. It was entered into the 1949 Cannes Film Festival. It was shot at the Centrumateljéerna Studios in Stockholm and on location in Värtahamnen and Turku in Finland. The film's sets were designed by the art director P.A. Lundgren. The film is based on Josef Kjellgren's 1938 play Okänd svensk soldat (Unknown Swedish Soldier).

Cast

 Adolf Jahr as Captain Greger
 George Fant as Håkan Eriksson
 Illona Wieselmann as Mimi
 Fritiof Billquist as First Mate
 Åke Fridell as Steward
 Stig Järrel as Man wearing fur
 Gösta Holmström as Second Mate
 Carl Ström as Engine-man
 Anders Börje as Christian
 Stig Johanson as Jerker 
 Jan Molander as 	Shipping Company Official
 Bengt Sundmark as 	Second Engine Officer Møen
 Georg Skarstedt as Strandmark
 Nils Hallberg as Boiler Stoker
 Josua Bengtson as 'Masthugget'
 Anders Andelius as 	Gutten
 Ivar Wahlgren as Boiler Stoker
 Sten Sture Modéen as Sailor 
 Sten Larsson as 	Drunk Sailor
 Gösta Holmström as 	Second Mate
 Henake Schubak as	Toivo
 Alexander von Baumgarten as 	Dirty Dick
 Emanuel Warhaftig as Polish Police Officer
 Elsa Meiring as 	Old Polish Lady
 Janina Appelqvist as 	Singing Girl at Dick's Bar
 Per-Axel Arosenius as Waiter
 Birger Lensander as Cook
 Gita Gordeladze as Dancer

References

Bibliography
 Sundholm, John. Historical Dictionary of Scandinavian Cinema. Scarecrow Press, 2012.

External links

1948 films
1940s Swedish-language films
1948 drama films
Swedish black-and-white films
Films directed by Hampe Faustman
Swedish drama films
Films shot in Finland
Films shot in Stockholm
1940s Swedish films